Jean-Pierre Azéma (born 1937) is a French historian.

Career
He is a member of the scientific counsel for the Institut François Mitterrand, an organisation founded by François Mitterrand with the goal of "contributing to the propagation of knowledge on the political and social history of modern France".  He supported Ségolène Royal.

Azéma is the author of several prominent historical works, making him somewhat an authority amongst France's historians.

A specialist of World War II, and more specifically of the Vichy Regime and the French Resistance, Jean-Pierre Azéma is a university lecturer and teaches history at the Institut d'études politiques de Paris.
He was also one of the historians called as witness for the trial of Maurice Papon, (alongside Marc-Olivier Baruch, Robert O. Paxton and Philippe Burrin).  He is also one of the authors of the film The Eye of Vichy (L’Œil de Vichy) by Claude Chabrol.  He attended the Conférence organiséd on the 60th anniversary of the death of Jean Moulin.

He is the father of Vichy historian Arianne Azéma.

Select works
6 juin 44, 2004 (with Robert O. Paxton, Philippe Burrin)
Jean Moulin : le politique, le rebelle, le résistant, 2003
Jean Cavaillès résistant ou La pensée en actes, 2002 (written under his direction)
De Münich à la Libération: 1938–1944, Cambridge University Press, 1990, new edition., 2002
Vichy : 1940–1944, 2000 (with Olivier Wieviorka) 
1938–1948 : les années de tourmente : de Munich à Prague : dictionnaire critique, 1995 (with François Bédarida)
Histoire de l'extrême droite en France, 1994 (under the direction of Michel Winock) Seuil, 
Jean Moulin et la Résistance en 1943, Jean-Pierre Azéma (ed), Institut d'histoire du temps présent, 1994
Les libérations de la France, 1993 (with Olivier Wieviorka)
La France des années noires, 1993 (with François Bédarida)
Le régime de Vichy et les Français, 1992 (with François Bédarida)
La IIIe République : 1870–1940, (with Michel Winock) Calmann-Lévy, 1970, new edition, 1991
1940, l'année terrible, Seuil, 1990, 
Paris under the occupation, Gilles Perrault, Jean-Pierre Azéma, Deutsch, 1989, 
Les communistes français de Munich à Châteaubriant : 1938–1941, 1987 (with Antoine Prost and Jean-Pierre Rioux)
Histoire générale politique et sociale : la France des années sombres, les années 40, 1987
La collaboration : 1940–1944, 1975
Les Communards, 1964 (with Michel Winock) Éditions du seuil, 1970

References

External links
Jean-Pierre Azema, historien, enseignant à Sciences-po Paris 

20th-century French historians
Historians of Nazism
Social historians
Historians of Vichy France
1937 births
Living people
People of French descent from Réunion
French male writers
Historians of World War II
Lycée Henri-IV teachers
21st-century French historians